Kamil Jafari (born 24 January 1946) is an Iranian sports shooter. He competed in the mixed skeet event at the 1976 Summer Olympics.

References

1946 births
Living people
Iranian male sport shooters
Olympic shooters of Iran
Shooters at the 1976 Summer Olympics
Place of birth missing (living people)